Lonesome Luke Loses Patients is a 1917 American short comedy film featuring Harold Lloyd.

Cast
 Harold Lloyd as Lonesome Luke
 Bebe Daniels
 Snub Pollard
 Bud Jamison
 Gus Leonard
 Charles Stevenson - (as Charles E. Stevenson)
 Fred C. Newmeyer
 Billy Fay
 Sammy Brooks
 Gilbert Pratt
 Margaret Joslin - (as Margaret Joslin Todd)
 Harry Todd
 Marie Mosquini

See also
 Harold Lloyd filmography

References

External links

1917 films
1917 comedy films
Silent American comedy films
American black-and-white films
1917 short films
American silent short films
Films directed by Hal Roach
Lonesome Luke films
American comedy short films
1910s American films